Judith Goslin Hall  (born July 3, 1939) is a pediatrician, clinical geneticist and dysmorphologist who is a dual citizen of the United States and Canada.

Early life and education 
The daughter of a minister, Judith Goslin Hall was born on July 3, 1939, in Boston, Massachusetts. She graduated from Garfield High School in Seattle and then attended Wellesley College in Wellesley, Mass. from which she earned her Bachelor of Arts degree in 1961.

She went to medical school in Seattle at the University of Washington (UW) from which she received an MD degree in 1966. She was also awarded an MS degree in Genetics from UW. She did her Pediatric training at Johns Hopkins Hospital, and did her fellowships in Medical Genetics and Pediatric Endocrinology.

Career 

In 1972, she returned to the University of Washington School of Medicine  and was given a joint appointment in the Departments of Pediatrics and Medicine as, successively, assistant, associate and full professor. She also gained additional depth of knowledge concerning congenital malformations by working in Seattle with the pioneer dysmorphologist, David W. Smith (1926–1981).

In 1981, Hall was named professor of medical genetics at the University of British Columbia and the Director of the Genetics Services for British Columbia. From 1990 to 2000, she was also Professor and head of the Department of Pediatrics at the University of British Columbia and BC Children's Hospital.

In 1988 she received a Killam Senior Fellowship for a sabbatical year at Oxford University, UK. During 2001, she was a Distinguished Fellow at Christ's College, Cambridge University, UK.

In 2005, she became an Emerita Professor at the University of British Columbia, engaged in Associations of Professors Emeriti (later the UBC Emeritus College), and served as the president in 2011–2012.

Research contributions 
Hall's research has been far-ranging in the areas of congenital malformations including neural tube defects, the genetics of short stature, the mechanisms of disease such as mosaicism and imprinting, the natural history of genetic disorders, the genetics of connective tissue disorders such as arthrogryposis, and monozygotic (identical) twins. She has contributed to the knowledge of a number of syndromes. Her name is associated with the Hall type of pseudoachondroplasia (a severe form of dwarfism with short limbs), Sheldon-Hall syndrome, and the Hall-Pallister syndrome (hamartoma in the hypothalamus tract, hypopituitarism, imperforate anus and polydactyly). Contributed to resource planning, career development, and continuing contributions of older academics. She described several forms of arthrogryposis and helped to define over 450 types.

Awards 
Hall has received a number of honors, including alumni awards from Garfield High School, Wellesley College, the University of Washington School of Medicine, and the University of British Columbia. In 1998, she was made an Officer of the Order of Canada as "a leader and world authority in both genetics and pediatrics" and having "contributed to the development of resources and services essential to coping with genetic illnesses"  In 2011, she became a Fellow of the Royal Society of Canada. In 2015, Hall was inducted into the Canadian Medical Hall of Fame and a Fellow of the Canadian Academy of Health Sciences.

Hall is quoted as saying, with regard to her recognition, that

See also
 Snatiation

References

External links
 Autobiography at Canadian Medical Association Journal
 UToronto Press Canadian Who's Who 2019

1939 births
Living people
American expatriate academics
American expatriates in Canada
American geneticists
Canadian geneticists
Canadian women biologists
Officers of the Order of Canada
Canadian pediatricians
Women pediatricians
University of Washington School of Medicine alumni
Academic staff of the University of British Columbia
Wellesley College alumni
Scientists from Boston
American women biologists
American women academics
20th-century Canadian biologists
20th-century Canadian women scientists
21st-century Canadian biologists
21st-century Canadian women scientists
Canadian women geneticists
Medical geneticists